Curra Railway Station is a closed railway station on Queensland's North Coast railway line. Nothing remains of the closed station.

References

Disused railway stations in Queensland
North Coast railway line, Queensland